Michael Anthony Guetlein (born November 22, 1967) is a United States Space Force lieutenant general who serves as the first commander of the Space Systems Command. He most recently served as the deputy director of the National Reconnaissance Office.

Education
 1991 Bachelor of Science, Mechanical Aerospace Engineering, Oklahoma State University, Stillwater
 1995 Master of Business Administration, Wright State University, Dayton, Ohio
 1999 Master of Organizational Management, The George Washington University, Washington, D.C.
 2005 Master of National Security and Policy Making, Naval War College, Newport, R.I.

Assignments

1. September 1991–September 1993, AC-130U Gunship Support Manager, Special Operations Program Office, Wright-Patterson Air Force Base, Ohio
2. October 1993–August 1994, Chief, B-2 Bomber Propulsion, B-2 Program Office, Wright-Patterson AFB, Ohio
3. August 1994–January 1996, Executive Officer, Engineering Directorate, Wright-Patterson AFB, Ohio
4. January 1996–July 1996, AC-130U Gunship Sortie Gen. Flight Commander, 4th Aircraft Maintenance Unit, Hurlburt Field, Fla.
5. July 1996–July 1997, AC-130H Gunship Flight Commander, 16th Aircraft Maintenance Unit, Hurlburt Field, Fla.
6. July 1997–June 1999, Air Force Intern, the Pentagon, Arlington, Va.
7. June 1999–March 2002, Deputy Program Manager, Space-Based Infrared System Ground Segment, Los Angeles AFB, Calif.
8. March 2002–March 2003, Director, Missile Warning Systems, Los Angeles AFB, Calif.
9. March 2003–June 2004, Executive Officer, Los Angeles AFB, Calif.
10. June 2004–June 2005, Student, Naval War College, Newport Naval Station, R.I.
11. June 2005–December 2006, Counterspace Program Element Monitor, the Pentagon, Arlington, Va.
12. December 2006–June 2008, Military Assistant to the Assistant Secretary of the Air Force for Acquisition, the Pentagon, Arlington, Va.
13. June 2008–July 2010, Commander, Rapid Reaction Squadron, Peterson AFB, Colo.
14. July 2010–June 2011, Secretary of Defense Corporate Fellow, Space Exploration Enterprises, Los Angeles, Calif.
15. June 2011–August 2014, Senior Materiel Leader, Space-Based Infrared System Production Division, Los Angeles AFB, Calif.
16. September 2014–April 2017, Program Director, Remote Sensing Systems Directorate, Los Angeles AFB, Calif.
17. April 2017–June 2019, Program Executive for Programs and Integration, Missile Defense Agency, Redstone Arsenal, Ala.
18. July 2019–August 2021, Deputy Director and Air Force Element Commander, National Reconnaissance Office, Chantilly, Va.
18. August 2021–present, Commander, Space Systems Command, Los Angeles AFB, Calif.

Awards and decorations

Guetlein is the recipient of the following awards:

Dates of promotion

Writings

References 

1967 births
Living people
Place of birth missing (living people)
Oklahoma State University alumni
Wright State University alumni
George Washington University alumni
Naval War College alumni
United States Air Force generals
United States Space Force generals